Arnaud Tanguy (born 21 January 1976) is a French former professional football player.

He played on the professional level in Ligue 1 and Ligue 2 for SM Caen, with his brother Stéphane Tanguy.

After one season in Championnat National for RC France, he retired from football in 2001 to become trader.

External links

1976 births
Living people
French footballers
Ligue 1 players
Ligue 2 players
Stade Brestois 29 players
Stade Malherbe Caen players
Racing Club de France Football players
Association football midfielders